Valentina L. Garza (also credited as Valentina Garza) is a Cuban-American screenwriter and television producer best known for series such as Jane the Virgin and The Simpsons. She resides in Los Angeles with her husband and children.

Career
A Los Angeles native, Valentina graduated from UC Berkeley with a BA in Comparative Literature.

Garza started out as a writers’ assistant on Telemundo’s Los Beltrán. Other series she worked on include الآنسة فرح;, Bordertown; The Baker and the Beauty (US); and George Lopez. Valentina was also the executive producer and screenwriter of the Jane the Virgin spin-off pilot, Jane the Novela. She’s currently under an overall deal with NBC Universal and has sold pilots to ABC, CBS, and FOX. More recently, she was signed to WME.

Valentina also wrote the lyrics to “Small Strike Zone” and “Off to Work,” “It’s Time,” and “Time to Say Goodbye” in her episodes of The Simpsons: "Loan-a Lisa" and "Four Great Women and a Manicure". She was nominated for an Annie Award for the latter episode.

References

External links
 

Living people
American women television writers
Year of birth missing (living people)
American writers of Cuban descent
American women television producers
University of California, Berkeley alumni
Writers from Los Angeles
Television producers from California